Mohammed Shami Ahmed (born 3 September 1990) is an Indian international cricketer who plays for the Indian national cricket team in all formats of the game as a right-arm fast bowler. He plays domestically for Bengal and in the Indian Premier League for Gujarat Titans.

He is a right-arm fast bowler, who bowls the ball off the seam and using swing, including reverse swing, to move the ball both ways. He has been described as a fine bowler at the end of a limited-overs innings and as "unplayable" at times in all formats.

Shami made his international debut in a One Day International (ODI) against Pakistan in January 2013, bowling four maiden overs. His Test debut in November 2013 saw him take a five-wicket haul against the West Indies. He is the fastest Indian bowler to take 100 ODI wickets. During the 2019 Cricket World Cup, he became the second Indian bowler to claim a hat-trick in a World Cup match.  Shami has an A grade central contract from the Board of Cricket Control in India (BCCI), the second highest grade of contract.

Early life and career
Shami grew up in the village of Sahaspur in Amroha, Uttar Pradesh, one of five children. His father Tauseef Ali was a farmer who had been a fast bowler in his youth; when Shami was 15 he was taken to Badruddin Siddique, a cricket coach in Moradabad, a town  from his home.

Shami worked hard on his technique throughout his time at Moradabad; after matches he would request the used balls so that he could develop the ability to reverse swing the older ball, a skill which would be integral to his success later in his career. He was not, however, selected for the Uttar Pradesh under-19 side, and later in 2005 Badruddin sent him to Kolkata to increase his chances of selection for a state side. After playing for the Dalhousie Athletic Club he was recommended to Debabrata Das, a former assistant secretary of the Cricket Association of Bengal, who was impressed with Shami's bowling and asked him to join his own club, Town Club. Das took Shami, who had no place to stay in Kolkata, to live with him. After bowling well for Town Club, Das asked one of the Bengal selectors, Sambaran Banerjee, to watch Shami bowl; Banerjee was impressed and selected him for the Bengal under-22 team.

Shami later joined Mohun Bagan Cricket Club, one of the best sides in Bengal, in order to be considered for selection to the full state side. He bowled to former Indian captain Sourav Ganguly in the Eden Gardens nets; Ganguly recommended him to the state selectors and soon after Shami was picked in the Bengal squad for the 2010–11 Ranji Trophy.

Domestic career

Shami took four wickets on his senior debut for Bengal in a Twenty20 match in October 2010. He made his first-class cricket debut the following month against Assam at Eden Gardens, taking three wickets in a high scoring match.

In February 2012 his bowling helped East Zone win their first Duleep Trophy title; he took eight wickets in the match and was described as "outstanding, consistently getting bounce and zip from just short of a good length". He had only played in the match following an injury to Abu Nechim, but it proved to be a significant breakthrough in Shami's career; he had been described as "little-known" before the match, but by April was being touted as a player to watch in the upcoming Indian Premier League season.

He was selected to tour the West Indies with the India A side and "impressed" with his bowling on pitches which were considered to be generally unhelpful to fast bowlers. Shami was considered to have been the "surprise package" of the tour for India A, and impressed the team's coach Lalchand Rajput with his strength and consistency whilst bowling, as well as with his batting; batting tenth in the first unofficial Test match, he scored 27 runs in a partnership of 73 with Cheteshwar Pujara which won the match for India A. Later in the year he was one of only two fast bowlers retained for the India A tour of New Zealand, although he only played in two of the six matches on the tour.

During the 2012–13 Ranji Trophy, Shami took 11 wickets in a match against Madhya Pradesh in November, including seven wickets for 79 runs (7/79) in the first innings, a return which included a hat-trick. The following month he took 4/36 and 6/71 against Hyderabad on a green wicket at Eden Gardens, his second ten-wicket match in only his 15th first-class game. In the five Ranji Trophy matches he played during the season he took 28 wickets at a bowling average of 21.25 runs per wicket, and in the 18 first-class matches he played before his Test match debut in 2013 he took 71 wickets, an average of four wickets each match.

Since making his international debut in 2013, Shami has played only occasionally for his state side. He played a limited overs match in March 2017 after not having played any competitive cricket for a period four months, and took part in four Ranji Trophy matches later in 2017, his first for around five years, to develop and maintain his fitness. A single first-class match for Bengal followed in 2018—with the BCCI requesting that he be limited to bowling no more than 15 over in each innings in the match to ensure his fitness for an upcoming Test series.

Indian Premier League 

Shami was signed by Kolkata Knight Riders, an Indian Premier League (IPL) franchise, in 2011; Kolkata's head coach Dav Whatmore had worked with the Bengal Cricket Association and had identified Shami, who had played Twenty20 matches for Bengal, as a player with potential. He played a single match for the side in the 2011 Champions League Twenty20, but despite being touted as a player likely to make an impact ahead of the 2012 tournament, he did not play in the IPL until 2013, making three appearances for Kolkata during the season.

Ahead of the 2014 season teams were allowed to retain a maximum of five players, and, following his international debut, Shami was signed by Delhi Daredevils in the player auction. He played in 12 of Delhi's 14 matches during the season, taking seven wickets; he was retained but did not play a match the following season after being ruled out with a knee injury. He played sporadically in the IPL during the following three seasons, making eight appearances for Delhi in 2016 and 2017 and just four in 2018 when he was again hampered by a knee injury.

After being released by Delhi ahead of 2019 season Shami was bought by Kings XI Punjab in the 2019 player auction. Fit again, he took 19 wickets, registered his first 3-wicket haul in IPL with 3/21 against Mumbai Indians at Wankhede Stadium and was the side's leading wicket-taker, a feat he repeated the following season when he took 20 wickets, the best return of his career. During the season he allowed only five runs during a super over against Mumbai Indians, taking the match, which Punjab eventually won, into a second super over. This was the first time in IPL history that a single-digit score had been defended in a super over and earned Shami praise for the way in which he bowled precise yorkers under pressure.

In the 2021 season, Shami took 19 wickets in 14 matches and finished as Punjab's leading wicket-taker for the third straight season and as the fifth highest wicket-taker in that year's competition. During the season he became the fourth bowler in franchise history to take 50 wickets for Punjab. Ahead of the 2022 IPL auction he was, however, released by the side. He took 20 wickets at an economy rate of 8.00 runs per over during the season as Gujarat won the league title in their first season.

International cricket

Test career 
Shami made his Test debut against West Indies in November 2013 in front of his home crowd at Eden Gardens, Kolkata. There, he took his maiden Test wicket – that of Kieran Powell – finishing with figures of 17–2–71–4 in the first innings of the Test match. In the second innings, his figures were 13.1–0–47–5. He had a dream debut, taking nine wickets for 118 runs – the most by an Indian pacer on debut, surpassing Munaf Patel's seven wickets for 97 runs at Mohali in 2006. 

He played Tests against South Africa and New Zealand and picked 6 and 10 wickets respectively. During the 2014 tour of England, Shami took 5 wickets in 3 matches and was involved in a 111-run partnership for the 10th wicket, with Bhuvneshwar Kumar in the first Test at Trent Bridge, scoring his maiden half-century in the process and helping India post 457 in the first innings.

He took 15 wickets in three Tests during the 2014–15 Border Gavaskar Trophy in Australia, and became the 20th Indian fast bowler to take 100 Test wickets, reaching the milestone in 29 Tests.

In 2018 he toured England with India, playing in all five Tests. He finished the series with 16 wickets, including six in the fourth Test.

2019–21 ICC World Test Championship 
During the 2019–21 ICC World Test Championship, in the 2019 India-West Indies two match test series, Shami took 9 wickets,  while he took 13 and 5 wickets in the series against South Africa (2019) and New Zealand (2020) respectively. He was included in the playing XI of the first international pink ball Test match organised in India, at Eden Gardens as the second match of the 2019–20 Bangladesh Tour of India, where he took two wickets. During the tour he also reached seventh position in the ICC Men's Player Rankings after taking 7 wickets in the first match, with his 790 rating points being the third-best for an India pace bowler with only Kapil Dev (877) and Jasprit Bumrah (832) having reached a higher rating previously.

During the 2020–21 Border-Gavaskar Trophy, Shami suffered a fracture on his arm while batting against Pat Cummins during the second innings of the first Test. He retired hurt while batting and was ruled out of the rest of the series.  Shami was the joint 10th highest wicket taker in the tournament, along with Jofra Archer, with 40 wickets in total. He was the highest wicket taker among the Indian pacers and the second highest of all Indian bowlers, behind only Ravichandran Ashwin.

He also played in the final of the Test Championship, against New Zealand at The Rose Bowl in Southampton and took 4 wickets, all in the first innings.

2021–23 ICC World Test Championship 
During the 2021–23 ICC World Test Championship, in the 2021 India-England series, on 16 August 2021, in India's second innings, Shami made his highest score and second half-century in Test cricket, with an unbeaten score of 56* in a partnership with Jasprit Bumrah, which helped team India to script a historical win against England. In spite of playing only 3 matches in the 5-match series, Shami finished as the fifth highest wicket-taker of the series with 11 wickets with the best figures of 4/95 coming during the first innings of the third match of the series.

During the first innings of the first Test of the India-South Africa 2021–22 Test series, Shami took 5 wickets for 44 runs and became the fifth Indian pacer (and with the fewest number of deliveries – 9896) to take 200 wickets in Test cricket. For his performances, the former head coach of  India, Ravi Shastri lauded him as 'The Sultan of Bengal' on Twitter. At the end of the match, which India eventually won, the Test captain of team India, Virat Kohli eulogised Shami for taking 8 wickets total in the match saying "For me he's in the best three seamers in the world at the moment." He finished the series with 14 wickets from 3 matches as the leading wicket taker of India in the series.

In the ongoing 2021–23 World Test Championship, Shami is the fifth-highest wicket-taker with 25 wickets in 6 matches.

ODI career
As a result of his performances in domestic matches, Shami was selected for India's One Day international (ODI) series against Pakistan, replacing his Bengali teammate Ashok Dinda and subsequently made his debut in the third ODI of the series in Delhi on 6 January 2013 and he returned figures of 1/23 from 9 overs in a low-scoring game that India won by 10 runs. In October 2013, he was selected in India's squad to face the touring Australians. After being left out of the team for the first three ODI matches, he played in all the remaining matches, taking seven wickets, including two three-wicket hauls and emerged as the fourth leading wicket-taker of the series.

In India's tour of New Zealand in 2014, Shami took 11 wickets in ODIs at an average of 28.72.

On 5 March 2014, during 2014 Asia Cup, against Afghanistan, Shami became the second fastest Indian to take 50 ODI wickets, reaching the feat in 29 innings. He ended the tournament with 9 wickets at 23.59.

After losing the Test series by 3–1 against England India won the ODI series by 3–1 in which Shami took 8 wickets at 24.16. In 5th ODI he bowled a good spell in the death overs, with tight line and length and middle-stump yorkers. After the match  cricket pundits called him the future of Indian bowling.

Shami took 10 wickets at 17.40 against West Indies in October 2014. In the 2nd ODI of the series he got his best bowling figure in ODIs as he picked up 4 wickets for 36 runs in his 9.3 overs.

He was in the 15-man squad for 5 ODIs against Sri Lanka in November 2014, but he was replaced by Dhawal Kulkarni due to a toe injury he suffered during the West Indies series.

For his performances in 2014, he was named in the World ODI XI by the ICC.

2015 ODI World Cup 
Shami was in the 15-man squad named for the 2015 World Cup and was eventually included in the playing XI. He took 4 wickets for 35 runs from his 9 overs in India's first match against Pakistan, helping India win the match. Against West Indies, he was awarded the Man of the Match after finishing with figures 8–2–35–3. He had a good game in the next as well, against Ireland, finishing with 3/41 from 9 overs. In the last of the league games, against Zimbabwe, he took another 3-wicket haul giving away 48 runs from his 9 overs which included two maidens. India went on to win all the league games. He took a brace against Bangladesh in the quarter final but had a poor game against Australia in the semi-final, which India lost, where he gave away 68 runs off 10 overs without picking a wicket, thus finishing the tournament with 17 wickets at an average of 17.29 and an economy rate of 4.81 as the fourth leading wicket-taker. In June, after the conclusion of the tournament, Shami revealed that he bowled through a recurring pain in his left knee. He later underwent a surgery.
For his performances in 2015, he was named in the World ODI XI by the ICC.

Shami returned to the squad for the 2017 ICC Champions Trophy after a two-year hiatus due to a shoulder injury. But due to lack of game time, he did not feature in any of the matches of the tournament.

2019 New Zealand Tour 
In January 2019, during the tour of New Zealand, Shami claimed his 100th ODI wicket in first of the five games bowling Martin Guptill out. He became the fastest Indian bowler to claim 100 ODI wickets, reaching the milestone in his 56th match during the first ODI against New Zealand at Napier. The Indian record of the fastest bowler to claim 100 ODI wickets was previously held by Irfan Pathan, who got there in his 59th match. , the world record is held by Afghanistan leg-spinner, Rashid Khan, who needed only 44 games to reach the mark.

Playing in four games throughout the series, Shami took nine wickets at an average of 15.33 and was named man of the series. According to Sportstar, this series rejuvenated the white ball carrier of Shami, helping him to book a spot in the 2019 Cricket World Cup squad.

2019 ODI Cricket World Cup 

In April 2019, he was named in India's squad for the 2019 Cricket World Cup for his performances in the white ball cricket. He was one of the only three fast bowlers to feature in the squad, the other two being Jasprit Bumrah and the white ball specialist, Bhuvneshwar Kumar. On 22 June 2019, in the match against Afghanistan, Shami took a hat-trick and became the ninth cricketer and the second Indian bowler after Chetan Sharma to claim a hat-trick in a World Cup match. On 30 June 2019, in the match against England, Shami took his first five-wicket haul in ODIs and became the first Indian bowler to take consecutive three four-wicket hauls in the World Cup, with 4/40 against Afghanistan, 4/16 against West Indies and 5/69 against England. After playing well in 4 back to back matches, the decision to select Bhuvneshwar Kumar over Shami raised eyebrows among the cricket pundits, who expressed their displeasure on the decision on Twitter. Although Shami featured only in 4 matches, he took 14 wickets, making him the 12th-highest wicket taker in the tournament, and the second best Indian, behind Jasprit Bumrah (who took 18 wickets in 9 matches). He had the best bowling strike rate of 15.07 and the best average of 13.78 of all the bowlers in the tournament with at least six overs bowled.

With 42 wickets from 21 matches in 2019, Shami finished the year as the leading wicket-taker in ODIs.

Shami was part of the three match ODI series between India and Australia in 2020, which team India eventually won by 2–1 margin. After going wicketless in the first match, he took 7 wickets in the next two matches  and finished the series as the leading wicket-taker. Following the series, Shami's ability to bowl yorkers persistently and taking wickets during the powerplay and death overs were greatly applauded.

In December, he was included in the squad of team India for the series against Australia in the Australian soil and he took 4 wickets in the 2 ODIs he played.

T20I career 
Shami made his debut in Twenty20 Internationals (T20I) on 21 March 2014 against Pakistan in the opening match of the 2014 T20 World Cup and took the wicket of Umar Akmal, to give him figures of 1/31 in 4 overs bowled. He played the next two matches, but was then dropped for the rest of the tournament.

He was included in the side in 2014 tour of England, following the Test series, in July. He played in the lone match of the series and finished with 3 wickets conceding 38 runs. Shami returned to the squad for 2016 ICC World Twenty20 after spending more than two years recuperating from the shoulder injury, but due to lack of form and game time, he did not feature in any of the matches of the tournament.

2021 T20 World Cup 
Although Shami had not performed as well in T20Is as he had in the other two formats, he was picked in the 2021 ICC Men's T20 World Cup for his performances in three consecutive Indian Premier League seasons. He was one of the three fast bowlers in the main squad, the other two being Jasprit Bumrah and the white-ball specialist, Bhuvneshwar Kumar. He was the only cricketer from Bengal in the squad.

Discussing the inclusion of Shami in team India's squad,  ESPNcricinfo wrote: "Bowling at the death is probably what gave Shami an edge over Deepak Chahar and Shardul Thakur [both in the reserves], who have had greater success up top. Shami has got 14 death-over wickets since IPL 2020, which is the same as Deepak Chahar, Shardul Thakur and Mohammed Siraj combined. He can move the ball both ways, as he's shown ample times in the past, and as a bonus, he has the undefinable ability to be unplayable regardless of format when he gets into his rhythm".

Shami went wicketless in the first two matches of the tournament, before setting career-best figures in consecutive matches against Afghanistan (with the figures of 3/32) and Scotland with 3/15. Shami played every match for India in the tournament.

2022 T20 World Cup 
Shami was initially placed on stand-by for 2022 T20 World Cup, but after Jasprit Bumrah was ruled out of the tournament after sustaining a back injury he was named as Bumrah's replacement.

Records 
 Shami took nine wickets in his debut Test match in 2013, the most by an Indian fast bowler on debut.
On 5 March 2014, he became the second fastest Indian bowler to take 50 ODI wickets.
 In January 2019, Shami became the fastest Indian bowler to take 100 ODI wickets.
 In June 2019, he became the second Indian to take a hat-trick in a World Cup match.
Highest wicket-taker in ODIs in 2019.
 In September 2021, Shami became the fourth bowler to have taken 50 wickets for Punjab Kings.
In December 2021, he became the third fastest Indian pacer with the least number of deliveries to take 200 Test wickets.
, Shami has the 10th career-best strike rate in One Day Internationals.
He holds the record of most consecutive four wickets in an innings in One Day Internationals (3).

Bowling style 
Shami is a right-arm fast bowler who has the ability to move the ball off the seam and using swing, including reverse swing, to move the ball both ways. According to ESPNcricinfo, the secret of Shami's success lies in his wrist with his run-up and action being quite smooth. Earlier he used to be accused of straying to leg once too often for searching wickets, but now he has shifted the line of attack to the left ever so slightly. As a result, when he bowls in the channel, he really does bowl in the channel. His wicket taking ability and bowling reverse swing make him one of the lethal bowlers of the world and which is why he has been described as 'unplayable' at times regardless of the formats.

Shami's ability of bowling yorkers continuously at much needed times has been discussed and praised by several former cricketers and critics. His wrist is firmly cocked at the point of delivery and his slightly split fingers come down so straight that the seam invariably comes out bolt upright.

Outside cricket 
Shami's father and his three brothers all played cricket, with one brother, Mohammed Kaif, making his List A debut for Bengal in 2021. During the COVID-19 lockdown in India in 2020 Shami trained alongside his brother in their home village of Sahaspur. During the lockdown Shami and his family helped to provide food for people in their village.

Shami married Hasin Jahan in 2014. The couple have one child. In 2020 Shami spoke about the impact that injuries and a string of allegations made by his wife had had on his mental health. He spoke of considering suicide on three occasions and credited his family with supporting him through the period.

Domestic abuse allegations
In March 2018, a First Information Report was lodged against Shami and members of his family by his wife, Hasin Jahan, citing domestic violence and adultery. A claim of rape was also made against Shami's elder brother. Shami was charged with offences relating to domestic violence, attempted murder, poisoning and criminal intimidation. Shami denied all of the allegations, claiming that they were a conspiracy and had been made to distract him from cricket. The Board of Control for Cricket in India (BCCI) withheld Shami from their national contracts list as a result of the allegations. His wife also claimed that Shami had been involved in match-fixing. This was investigated by the anti-corruption unit run by the BCCI and on 22 March the board reinstated Shami's national contract, clearing him of the corruption charges.

On 2 September 2019, a court in Alipore issued an arrest warrant against Shami in connection to the domestic violence charges, providing him with 15 days after his return to India to turn himself in. The warrant was stayed by a district court on 9 September because the court that had issued the warrant failed to issue a summons to appear in court after filing the charge sheet.

Victim of online abuse 
In October 2021, Shami, the only Muslim player in India's side at the time, became victim to an online trolling campaign and was subjected to a range of abuse, much of it Islamophobic, on social media following India's loss to Pakistan during the 2021 ICC Men's T20 World Cup. He had conceded 43 runs during the match and was India's most expensive bowler. Several current and former cricketers, including India's captain Virat Kohli, publicly supported Shami following the abuse, with Kohli specifically addressing the Islamophobic nature of the abuse Shami had received.

See also
 List of India cricketers who have taken five-wicket hauls on Test debut

Notes

References

External links

 

1990 births
Living people
Indian cricketers
Indian Muslims
Bengal cricketers
East Zone cricketers
Kolkata Knight Riders cricketers
Delhi Capitals cricketers
Punjab Kings cricketers
India Twenty20 International cricketers
India One Day International cricketers
One Day International hat-trick takers
India Test cricketers
Cricketers who have taken five wickets on Test debut
Cricketers at the 2015 Cricket World Cup
Cricketers at the 2019 Cricket World Cup
Gujarat Titans cricketers